Carl Folke Billquist (19 May 1933 – 24 May 1993) was a Swedish actor. He appeared in 60 films and television shows between 1961 and 1993.

Partial filmography

 Lyckodrömmen (1963) - Fabian Widefjäll
 All These Women (1964) - The Young Man
 Heja Roland! (1966) - Svensson
 En sån strålande dag (1967) - Claes, ski instructor
 Miss and Mrs Sweden (1969) - Dick Lönn
 Grisjakten (1970) - Haller&Ziegler representative
 Honeymoon (1972) - Salesman
 The Day the Clown Cried (1972) - Gestapo Officer #2
 Håll alla dörrar öppna (1973) - Solveig's Suitor
 Fimpen (1974) - Principal
 Garaget (1975) - Dr. Orlander
 91:an och generalernas fnatt (1977) - Sgt. Revär
 Barna från Blåsjöfjället (1980) - Captain Persson
 Höjdhoppar'n (1981) - President
 Peter-No-Tail (1981) - Bill (voice)
 The Simple-Minded Murderer (1982) - Flodin
 Jönssonligan och Dynamit-Harry (1982) - Kriminalkommissarie Persson
 Fanny and Alexander (1982) - Police Superintendent Jespersson - Ekdahlska huset
 Raskenstam (1983) - Photographer
 Jönssonligan får guldfeber (1984) - Persson
 Pelle Svanslös i Amerikatt (1985) - Bill (voice)
 Gröna gubbar från Y.R. (1986) - Pansarsson
 Min pappa är Tarzan (1986) - Larsson
 Jim & piraterna Blom (1987) - Jim's teacher
 Den hemliga vännen (1990) - The exhausted friend
 Dockpojken (1993) - Tillsyningsmannen (uncredited)

References

External links

1933 births
1993 deaths
20th-century Swedish male actors
Swedish male film actors
Swedish male television actors
Actors from Malmö